The Class 62 is a diesel locomotive of the Belgian State Railways.

These diesels found use all over Belgium. Five (6321, 6325, 6391-6393) were sold to ACTS in the Netherlands in 1999.

Four units (6225, 6227, 6313 and 6324) are outfitted with TBL2 signaling and a Scharfenberg coupler. This is for hauling broken-down or unpowered TGVs on line 2. They display the letters "TBL2" on the nose.

Some others have been transferred to Infrabel, who manage the Belgian rail infrastructure; they were repainted in blue and white.

References

External links

 HLD 62
 Photos on Railfaneurope.net

National Railway Company of Belgium locomotives
Bo′Bo′ locomotives
Diesel-electric locomotives of Belgium
Railway locomotives introduced in 1961
La Brugeoise et Nivelles locomotives
Standard gauge locomotives of Belgium